Thomas Maclellan, 2nd Lord Kirkcudbright was a Scottish nobleman, nephew of Robert Maclellan, 1st Lord Kirkcudbright and the son of William Maclellan and Rosina Agnew.

Maclellan's support for the Covenanters led to his ruin. In 1638 the Solemn League of the Covenant was signed throughout Scotland raising objecting to the enforcement of the use of the Anglican Book of Common Prayer in Scotland. During this period many of the local ministers favoured the Covenant and this caused difficulties that involved Lord Kirkcudbright. Thomas Maclellan was charged with the raising of a feudal army in the parishes of Dunrod, Galtway and Kirkcudbright to support the Solemn League and Covenant. On 28 July 1640 Thomas Maclellan married Janet, a daughter of William Douglas, 1st Earl of Queensberry by Isabel Kerr. In 1640 he was appointed Colonel of the South Regiment, and accompanied the Scottish army into England.

In 1644 the Scottish Parliament appointed him Steward of Kirkcudbrightshire, and subsequently he was present at the Battle of Philiphaugh with his regiment, where, by their gallantry they greatly contributed towards the victory of the Scottish forces. For his good service at Philliphaugh he was awarded by Parliament a significant reimbursement (poss. £750), raised from the estates of Lord Herries, but which it is alleged was never received.

From his habit of always marching at the head of his regiment with a barrel of brandy, which upon long marches and other needful occasions he would freely distribute to his followers, he became very popular among the troops.

Joining the Scottish Army, a force of some 9,000 men, under the Earl of Leven Maclellan's regiment marched to Marston Moor where they joined forces with the English Parliamentary troops under Cromwell. On the battlefield Lord Kirkcudbright's Regiment ‘Dispersed and Overthrew the Royalist Cavalry opposed to them’.

The Royalist James Graham, 1st Marquess of Montrose had taken military control of Scotland, and defeated the Covenanters in a series of battles culminating in the battle of Kilsyth. Part of the Scottish army under Alexander Leslie, including Lord Kirkcudbright's Regiment, was sent north to meet Montrose. This they did at Philliphaugh, near Selkirk.

The prisoners taken at Philliphaugh were executed as traitors, with many shot dead in the courtyard at Newark Castle; others were thrown to their deaths from the parapets of the Ettrick Bridge, drowning in the river below.

1647 deaths
Year of birth unknown
Lords of Parliament (pre-1707)